Perché uccidi ancora (English title: Blue Summer) is a 1965 Italian western film adventure directed by José Antonio de la Loma and Edoardo Mulargia.

Plot
Steven MacDougall quits the army when he receives the message that his father has been gunned down by a member of the Lopez clan. He hurries to protect his kin but the Lopez clan knows that he's coming. Only scarcely he escapes their trap. When he's eventually joined his family, their farm is attacked, yet Steven fights of his enemies another time. Now the fiendish Lopez clan hires a professional assassin from outside.

Cast
Anthony Steffen	... 	Steve McDougall
Ida Galli	... 	Judy McDougall 
Aldo Berti	... 	Gringo
Gemma Cuervo	... 	Pilar Gómez (as Jennifer Crowe)
José Calvo	... 	López (as Josepe Calvo)
Hugo Blanco	... 	Manuel Lopez
José Torres	... 	Lopez Henchman
Franco Latini	... 	Oliveras (as Frank Campbell)
Ignazio Leone
Lino Desmond	... 	Gringo's brother
Willi Colombini
Stelio Candelli		(as Stanley Kent)
Giovanni Ivan Scratuglia	... 	Lopez Henchman (as Giovanni Ivan)

References

External links
 

1965 films
1960s Italian-language films
1965 Western (genre) films
Spaghetti Western films
Films directed by José Antonio de la Loma
Films directed by Edoardo Mulargia
Films with screenplays by Edoardo Mulargia
1960s Italian films